Fragmentos De Una Tarde Somnolienta is the first EP edited by the Argentine post-rock band Hacia Dos Veranos, released in 2005 in Argentina by MuyModerna Records and in England and Singapore in February 2006 by I Wish I Was Unpopular Records.
The EP was released under a Creative Commons license and until July 2007 was available for download on the band's website.

The three tracks included in the EP will later become part of their first full-length album De Los Valles y Volcanes.

Track listing 
 "Preludio" (5:08)
 "Sueño" (6:01)
 "Despertar" (1:57)

All tracks were composed and arranged by Ignacio Aguiló, Diego Martínez and Sebastián Henderson.

Notes 
 Mixed in Estudio El Árbol by Juan Stewart and Hacia Dos Veranos.

Performers 
Ignacio Aguiló: guitar
Diego Martínez: bass
Julia Bayse: flute, keyboards
Andrés Edelstein: drums

References

External links 
Hacia Dos Veranos' Official Website
Brief review of Fragmentos De Una Tarde Somnolienta
Hacia Dos Veranos' MySpace
MuyModerna Records

2005 debut EPs